The Indonesia Open in an annual badminton tournament organized by the Badminton Association of Indonesia (PBSI) since 1982. It became part of the BWF Super Series tournament in 2007 and got the Super Series Premier status in 2011. Following the restructurisation to BWF World Tour, since 2018 it became one of only three tournaments to be granted Super 1000 level.

Host cities
Below is the nine cities that have hosted the tournament. The tournament's current host city is Jakarta.
 1982–1988, 1993, 1995, 1998, 2000–2001, 2004–2019, 2022: Jakarta
 1989: Pontianak
 1990: Samarinda
 1991: Bandung
 1992: Semarang
 1994: Yogyakarta
 1996: Medan
 1997: Surakarta
 1999: Denpasar
 2002: Surabaya
 2003: Batam
 2021: Badung Regency

Sponsorships
 Pelita Jaya (1987–1988)
 Pelita Khatulistiwa (1989)
 Pelita Mahakam (1990)
 Indocement Pelita Parahyangan (1991)
 555 (1992)
 Indomie (1993)
 RCTI (1994)
 Sony (1995–1996)
 Sanyo (Sanyo Indonesia Open, 1998–2003)
 Djarum (Djarum Indonesia Open, 2004–2013)
 BCA (BCA Indonesia Open, 2014–2017)
 Blibli (Blibli Indonesia Open, 2018–2019)
 SimInvest (SimInvest Indonesia Open, 2021)
 East Ventures (East Ventures Indonesia Open, 2022)

Past winners

Multiple winners
Below is the list of the most successful players in the Indonesia Open:

 – Tony Gunawan won one title representing Indonesia and one with the United States

Performances by nation

See also
 Indonesia Masters
 Indonesia Masters Super 100
 Indonesia International

References

External links
BWF: Indonesia Open Past Champions
Smash: Indonesian Open

 
Badminton tournaments in Indonesia
Annual sporting events in Indonesia
1982 establishments in Indonesia
Recurring sporting events established in 1982